Križovec is a small village in Međimurje County, Croatia, part of the town of Mursko Središće.

References

Populated places in Međimurje County